Woodruff is an unincorporated community in Johnson Township, LaGrange County, Indiana.

Allen Woodruff was the name of an early postmaster.

Geography

References

Unincorporated communities in LaGrange County, Indiana
Unincorporated communities in Indiana